Grimm's Circle is a paranormal romance series by author Shiloh Walker, an American romance author. The first book in the series came out in 2009. The characters, known as the Grimm, are based on characters from common fairy tales and folklore and are written as guardian angels who fight demons. The books are published by Samhain Publishing.

Series origin
Walker's website states the series was in part inspired by the TV show Buffy the Vampire Slayer.

Series order
Retrieved from Series Page at author website: 

 Candy Houses 10/2009
 No Prince Charming 1/2010
 I Thought It Was You 7/2010
 Crazed Hearts 7/2010
 Tarnished Knight 10/2010

References

Shelfari
Series page

External links
 Official website
Series page

Paranormal romance novel series
American romance novels